Islamic persecution may refer to:
Persecution of Muslims
Persecution by Muslims